Director is a 2009 action film directed by Aleks Rosenberg, produced by Alex Cohen, and starring Claudia Davilla, Stephane Kay, Mike Paris and Wu-Tang Clan-affiliated group's Prodigal Sunn. The film is set in Miami, Florida.

Plot
Adriana, a dancer from Caracas, arrives in Miami with her camera and a dream of becoming a famous film director. Answering an ad, she is hired by French Producers, JR and his unstable brother Mark, to direct a podcast mocumentary about a jewelry store robbery for one of JR's wealthy clients. Her dream is quickly shattered when the store manager is badly hurt and she realizes that she is filming an actual robbery. Having no working visa and low on cash she decides to join the brothers and their partner-in-crime, Bull (prodigal Sunn), making reality robbery films and becoming infamous by posting them on the Internet.

Cast
Claudia Davilla as Adriana
Stephane Kay as JR
Mike Paris as Mark
Prodigal Sunn as Bull
Richard Booker as Mr.M
Dominic La Banca as Captain Franck Laplata
James McEvoy as Inspector Nolan McCall
Tina Powers as Flight Attendant

Music
The soundtrack includes music by Fat Joe, Burning Brides, Dan Marciano, Ghostface Killah, Rick Ross, Prodigal Sunn, Sunz Of Man, Michael "MD" Dunston, Papi Shulo and more.

External links

2009 action films